Archana Teacher is a 1981 Indian Malayalam film, directed by P. N. Menon and produced by Madhu. The film stars Madhu, Sukumari, Venu Nagavally and Sankaradi in the lead roles. The film featured a musical score by Shyam.

Cast
 
Madhu 
Sukumari 
Venu Nagavally 
Sankaradi 
Ambika 
Aranmula Ponnamma 
P. K. Abraham 
Seema 
T. P. Madhavan

Soundtrack
The music was composed by Shyam and the lyrics were written by Sreekumaran Thampi.

References

External links
 

1981 films
1980s Malayalam-language films
Films directed by P. N. Menon (director)